The Saint Lucianese ambassador in Taipei is the official representative of the Government in Castries to the Government of Taiwan.

St. Lucia and Taiwan maintained diplomatic relations from 1984, during the first premiership of John Compton. Compton's successor Kenny Anthony led his government to recognize China in August 1997. Though relations between St. Lucia and Taiwan were reestablished in April 2007, the first ambassador of St. Lucia to Taiwan, Hubert Emmanuel, was not appointed until 2015.

List of representatives

Foreign relations of Saint Lucia

References 

China
Saint Lucia